El Cocuy is a town and municipality in the Colombian Department of Boyacá, part of the sub-region of the Gutiérrez Province. The national natural park El Cocuy National Park is nearby.

Born in El Cocuy 
 Santos Gutiérrez, former president of Colombia

External links 
 Photos El Cocuy

Municipalities of Boyacá Department